Take the Money & Run (or Take the Money and Run) is a reality game show that premiered on August 2, 2011 as part of the ABC network's 2011–12 primetime schedule. The series is unscripted and involves contestants trying to hide a briefcase filled with $100,000 from professional detectives and other investigators. The show takes place in various locales around the United States. The series ended with its sixth and final episode on September 6, 2011.

Overview 
The contestants are loaned an SUV and a cellular phone, and are given one hour to hide the case. At the end of the hour, the contestants are taken into custody and questioned by interrogators in an attempt to locate the case. The contestants are also isolated from each other for the duration of the 48 hours.  The detectives are given the GPS recordings of the route that the contestants took in the SUV, telephone records of who they called, and all receipts. If the detectives can locate the case within 48 hours, they are awarded the $100,000. If not, the contestants win the prize.

Production 
The producers are Profiles Television and Jerry Bruckheimer Television. Horizon Alternative Television is the distributor in the United States. The executive producers are Jerry Bruckheimer, Bertram van Munster, Jonathan Littman, Elise Doganieri and Philip Morrow.  Kristie Anne Reed and Mark Dziak are co-executive producers. The show was written by Philip Morrow, Kieran Doherty, and Matthew Worthy of Wild Rover Productions.

The recurring cast includes interrogators Paul Bishop, a writer and LAPD detective who has published many books and written many episodes for television and is the supervisor of a sex crimes unit, and Mary Hanlon Stone, a deputy district attorney with the office of the Los Angeles County District Attorney.

Episodes

Reception 
The show has received mixed reviews from critics, with Metacritic scoring it a 56 out of 100.

References

External links 
Official website (via Internet Archive)

2010s American reality television series
2011 American television series debuts
2011 American television series endings
American Broadcasting Company original programming
2010s American game shows
English-language television shows
Television series by Warner Horizon Television
Television shows set in the United States
Television shows filmed in California
Television shows filmed in Florida
Television shows filmed in Illinois